Coal forests were the vast swathes of wetlands that covered much of the Earth's tropical land areas during the late Carboniferous (Pennsylvanian) and Permian times.  As plant matter from these forests decayed, enormous deposits of peat accumulated, which later changed into coal.

Much of the carbon in the peat deposits produced by coal forests came from photosynthetic splitting of existing carbon dioxide, which released the accompanying split-off oxygen into the atmosphere. This process may have greatly increased the oxygen level, possibly as high as about 35%, making the air more easily breathable by animals with inefficient respiratory systems, as indicated by the size of Meganeura compared to modern dragonflies.

Coal forests covered tropical Euramerica (Europe, eastern North America, northwesternmost Africa) and Cathaysia (mainly China). Climate change devastated these tropical rainforests during the Carboniferous period. The Carboniferous rainforest collapse was caused by a cooler drier climate that initially fragmented, then collapsed the rainforest ecosystem.  During most of the rest of Carboniferous times, the coal forests were mainly restricted to refugia in North America (such as the Appalachian and Illinois coal basins) and central Europe.

At the very end of the Carboniferous period, the coal forests underwent a resurgence, expanding mainly in eastern Asia, notably China; they never recovered fully in Euramerica.  The Chinese coal forests continued to flourish well into Permian times.  This resurgence of the coal forests in very late Carboniferous times seems to have coincided with a lowering of global temperatures and a return of extensive polar ice in southern Gondwana, perhaps due to lessening of the greenhouse effect as the massive coal deposition process extracted carbon dioxide from the atmosphere.

Environment

The coal forests seem to have been areas of flat, low-lying swampy areas with rivers flowing through from higher, drier land. When the rivers flooded, silt gradually built up into natural levees. Lakes formed as some areas subsided, while formerly wet areas became dry from silt buildups. When a forested area became dry enough to be set on fire by lightning, the resulting forest fire left charcoal, the fusain component of coal.

Plant life
There seems to have been a rich and varied flora, with sets of species for each type of growing condition. The most varied flora seems to have been leave vegetation, with many species of trees, bushes, creepers, etc. Thickets of Calamites seem to have favored the edges of lakes and waterways. Lycopsid genera specialized in various roles: Paralycopodites as a pioneer on newly silted lakes shallow enough for land vegetation to start; Diaphorodendron later when the ground had become peaty. Other species specialized in re-settling land which had been briefly deforested by flooding: Synchysidendron and Lepidodendron in mineral-soil areas and Lepidophloios in peat areas. Cordaites may have favored drier areas of the swamp. One author thinks that Sigillaria favored the intermediate areas between levee habitat and swamp habitat. In the later part of this period tree ferns tended to take over from lycopsid trees.

Some of the characteristic plants of the coal forests were:
Sigillaria
Lepidodendron
Calamites
pteridosperms

British coal forest fossils
Genera recorded in Great Britain include:
Pteridosperm leaves: Alethopteris, Callipteridium, Cyclopteris (leaf bases), ?Desmopteris, Dicksonites, Eusphenopteris, Fortopteris, Hymenophyllites, Karinopteris, Laveinopteris, Linopteris, Lonchopteris, Lyginopteris, Macroneuropteris, Margaritopteris, Mariopteris, Neuralethopteris, Neuropteris, Odontopteris, Palmatopteris, Paropteris, Reticulopteris
Pteridosperm spore organs: Aulacotheca (male), Boulaya, Potoniea (male), Whittleseya (male)
Pteridosperm seeds: Gnetopsis, Hexagonocarpus, Holcospermum, Lagenospermum, ?Polypterocarpus, Rhabdocarpus, Trigonocarpus
Fern fronds: Aphlebia, Bertrandia, Corynepteris, Crossotheca, Cyathocarpus, Lobatopheris, Oligocarpia, Pecopteris, Polymorphopteris, Renaultia, Sphyropteris, Sturia, Zeilleria
Tree-fern leaves: Caulopteris
Tree-fern stems: Artisophyton, Megaphyton
Lycopsid tree stems and leafy shoots: Cyperites, Lepidodendron, Ulodendron
Lycopsid tree stems: Asolanus, Bothrodendron, Cyclostigma, Lepidophloios, Sigillaria, Sublepidophloios, Syringodendron (de-barked)
Lycopsid reproductive parts: Flemingites, Lepidodostrobus, Lepidodostrobophyllum (sporophylls), Sigillariostrobus
Lycopsid (herbaceous) stems: Lycopodites, Selaginellites
Sphenopsid leaves: Annularia, Asterophyllites
Sphenopsid stems: Calamites
Sphenopsid reproductive parts: Bowmanites, Calamostachys, Macrostachya, Palaeostachya
Cordaite leaves: Cordaites
Cordaite stem pith case: Artisia (pith cast)
Cordaite seeds: Cordaicarpus
Cordaite cones and seeds: Cordaitanthus
May be progymnosperm: leaves: Noeggerathia
Conifer leaves: Walchia
Seeds: Carpolithus, Cornucarpus, Samaropsis

Palaeontologists have described many species for some of these genera, e.g. (in Britain): Sigillaria 33, Lepidodendron 19, Alethopteris (pteridosperm leaves) 11, Calamites 8.

Some easily identified species occur over a wide area but only for a small part of the coal-forming period, and are thus useful as zone fossils.

Animal life
Animals inhabiting the coal forests were invertebrates (particularly insects), fish, labyrinthodont amphibians, and early reptiles. Amphibians were widespread, but once the coal forests fragmented, the new environment was better suited to reptiles, which became more diverse and even varied their diet in the rapidly changing environment.

See also
These films and TV series are set partly in coal forests:
Prehistoric Park Episode 5: ("The Bug House")
Walking with Monsters Episode Two: "Reptile's Beginnings"

References

External links to reconstruction images of coal forest
Coal forest. Department of Earth and Environmental Sciences, The Open University. Retrieved January 6, 2012.
Coal Forest Reconstruction. Burpee Museum of Natural History (March 2000). Retrieved January 6, 2012.

Image from Das Rektorat der WWU Münster. Westfalische Wilhelms-Universitat Munster. Retrieved January 6, 2012.

Carboniferous paleogeography
Carboniferous life